St Lawrence railway station is a former railway station in the village of St Lawrence on the Isle of Wight.

History
It opened in 1897 and was the original terminus of the branch line from Merstone until the 1½ mile extension to Ventnor was completed in June 1900. From 1927 the station was downgraded to the status of an unstaffed halt.

Stationmasters
William Bayley ca. 1899 (afterwards station master at Ventnor Town)
E. Wadmore 1905 - 1912 
Charles Dennett ca. 1920 (afterwards station master at Yarmouth)

Location 
The station was located between a steep cliff face and a public road. During the early years of the line's operation, rock falls were common. This problem was alleviated when the undergrowth took hold on the cliff face.

The short distance between the south portal of the St. Lawrence tunnel and the station was widely regarded as one of the finest views to be had on the island's railways.

Today the station building is a private residence. The trackbed has been filled in up to the level of the platform. The steep road bridge crossing at the eastern end of the station is still evident. The trackbed towards Ventnor is now covered by modern housing.

Other stations on the branch 

The other stations on the Ventnor West branch were:

 Merstone (where the branch joined the Newport-Sandown line)
 Godshill
 Whitwell
 Ventnor West

References

External links 
 Subterranea Britannica: SB-Sites: St. Lawrence Station

Disused railway stations on the Isle of Wight
Former Isle of Wight Central Railway stations
Railway stations in Great Britain opened in 1897
Railway stations in Great Britain closed in 1952